Martin de Porres (Juan Martin de Porres, 1579–1639) is a Peruvian Roman Catholic patron saint of mixed-race people and racial harmony, usually depicted holding a black scapular and capuce in iconography.

San, Saint or St. Martin de Porres may also refer to:

Places
 San Martín de Porres District, a district in Lima, Peru, located in the area known as Cono Norte
 San Martín de Porres, Las Palmas, Panama
 San Martín de Porres, Santiago, Panama
 San Martin de Porres, Parañaque, the Philippines

Schools
 St Martin de Porres, Adelaide, an elementary school in Sheidow Park, South Australia, Australia
 St. Martin Secondary School, a high school under the separate school system in Mississauga, Ontario, Canada
 St Martin de Porres School (Ghana)
 University of San Martín de Porres, Lima, Peru
 Central Saint Martins, the College of Arts and Design of the University of the Arts London, United Kingdom
 Saint Martin's School of Art, an art college that merged to form Central Saint Martins in 1989
 Cristo Rey St. Martin College Prep formerly St. Martin de Porres High School, a Catholic school in Waukegan, Lake County, Illinois, USA
 Saint Martin de Porres High School (Detroit), a defunct school in Wayne County, Michigan, USA
 St. Martin de Porres High School (Cleveland), a school in Cleveland, Cuyahoga County, Ohio, USA
 St. Martin de Porres School, in Philadelphia. See List of schools of the Roman Catholic Archdiocese of Philadelphia

Other uses
 Church of St. Martin de Porres (Poughkeepsie, New York), a Roman Catholic parish church
 Club Deportivo Universidad de San Martín de Porres, a football club based in Lima, Peru
 Saint Martin de Porres (sculpture), a 1963 statue by Father Thomas McGlynn
 St. Martin de Porres Hospital, a Catholic hospital in Eikwe, Ghana
 San Martín de Porres (telenovela), a Mexican telenovela

See also
 Saint Martin (disambiguation)
 St Martin's School (disambiguation), other schools named Saint Martin